The K-pop Hot 100 is a music singles chart launched in South Korea by Billboard in conjunction with Billboard Korea on August 25, 2011. The chart was based on digital sales via leading websites, as well as downloads from mobile service sites using an industry-standard formula and the most credible music data sources within South Korea. The chart was first discontinued in 2014, as of the July 16 issue, and reestablished three years later in December 2017—the first new issue published was for the period dated May 29–June 4, 2017. It was discontinued again in April 2022. The final song to reach number-one on the K-pop Hot 100 was "Love Dive" by Ive, on the issue dated April 30.

List of number-one songs

Notes

References

External links
 Current Billboard K-Pop 100 on Billboard Korea

2010s in South Korean music
Korea K-Pop Hot 100
Lists of number-one songs in South Korea